Red Fort, also known as Muzaffarabad Fort, is a 17th-century fortification located in Muzaffarabad, Azad Jammu and Kashmir, Pakistan. It was built by the Chak dynasty of Kashmir. The fort is locally referred to as the 'Rutta Qila' or just 'qila'.

Construction
Chak rulers of Kashmir anticipated a threat to the city from the Mughals. Construction was initiated in 1559 at a strategic location. The Mughal Empire annexed Kashmir in 1587, and the fort lost its importance.  Finally, the construction of the fort was completed in 1646 in the reign of Sultan Muzaffar Khan of the Bomba Dynasty — the founder of Muzaffarabad.

Architecture
The architecture of the fort shows that great experts in design and structure participated in its construction. It is surrounded on three sides by the Neelum River formerly known as the Kishenganga River. The northern part of the fort had terraces with steps leading to the bank of the river. The eastern side was very well protected from the hazards of flood waters, but some parts on the north side have suffered damage. There used to be an inn at the entrance to the fort, but only traces of that structure remain now.

Abandonment
In 1846, Maharaja Gulab Singh of the Dogra dynasty began reconstruction and extension of the fort for political and military operations and his successor Maharaja Ranbeer Singh completed the work. The Dogra military then used the fort till 1926, after which a new cantonment was built, leaving the red fort abandoned once again. Towards the middle of 1947, the Dogra forces left, leaving the fort abandoned. The fort is now located in Muzaffarabad, Pakistani-administered Kashmir.

Damage
Most of the fort's relics were stolen and a large portion was destroyed during the 2005 Kashmir earthquake.

See also
 List of forts in Pakistan
 List of cultural heritage sites in Azad Kashmir

References

Archaeological sites in Azad Kashmir
Forts in Azad Kashmir
1646 establishments in Asia